Ribbons VI is a public art work by artist Stephen Fischer. It was installed in the Menomonee Valley in downtown Milwaukee, Wisconsin in 1989.

Description
The sculpture has an abstract form that combines an open circle and a squiggle forged in Cor-ten steel. The circle rests directly on the ground, and the squiggle rises from its top, reaching out vertically and slightly diagonally. The fabrication style is consistent with other works by the artist.

References

Outdoor sculptures in Milwaukee
1989 sculptures
Steel sculptures in Wisconsin
Abstract sculptures in Wisconsin
1980s establishments in Wisconsin